Titanio is a genus of moths of the family Crambidae.

Species

Former species
Titanio angustipennis Zerny, 1914

References

Natural History Museum Lepidoptera genus database

Odontiini
Crambidae genera
Taxa named by Jacob Hübner
Taxa described in 1825